Charles Billingsley may refer to:

 Charles Billingsley (cricketer) (1910–1951), Irish cricketer
 Charles Billingsley (musician) (born 1970), Christian singer and worship leader